Ipolite Khvichia (Georgian: იპოლიტე ხვიჩია) (31 December 1910 - 1 February 1985) - Georgian actor, People's Artist of Georgia.

Biography 
In 1934 he graduated from Tbilisi Industrial-Economic College. In 1932-1936 he was an actor in Tsulukidze and Gegechkori regional theaters. Starring mainly in comedic roles: Quchara and Khariton (Polycarpe Kakabadze's "The Roaring Tulip", "The Marriage of Colmeurn"), Trufaldino and Marquis Floripopolis (Carlo Goldoni's "Servant of Two Masters", "Hotel Hostess"), Natsarkekia (Giorgi Nakhutsrishvili and Boris Gamrekeli's "Natsarkekia"), Kokhtaya (Avksenty Tsagareli's" Other times now") and others.

In 1937 he moved to Kutaisi Lado Meskhishvili Theater. From 1961 to 1966, he performed the roles of Shakro (Otar Mamphoria in "The Shadow of Metekhi") and Spiridon (Natalya Azyan's "The Last Masquerade") at the Shota Rustaveli Theater.

Since 1956 he starred in films.

He is buried in the Saburtalo Pantheon of public figures in Tbilisi.

Filmography

Awards 
1960: People's Artist of Georgia

References 

1910 births
1985 deaths
Soviet male actors